Emir Saitoski (born 8 May 2003) is a footballer who plays as a winger for Slovenian PrvaLiga club Domžale. Initially a youth international for North Macedonia, he switched his national allegiance to Slovenia in 2022.

Career statistics

Club

References

2003 births
Living people
Slovenian footballers
Macedonian footballers
Association football wingers
Slovenia under-21 international footballers
North Macedonia youth international footballers
Slovenian PrvaLiga players
NK Domžale players